The Waihi-Waikino Gold Tramway (also known locally as The Rake) was a narrow-gauge railway which ran between gold mines at Waihi and the Victoria Battery at Waikino. Owned by the Waihi Gold Mining Company, it operated from 1897 to 1952. It was the only private railway in New Zealand used by the gold industry.

History

The township of Waihi was home to the Martha Gold Mine, with the first stamping battery coming into use in 1882. By the mid 1890s the mine was needing a new stamping battery, which was decided to be put down the Ohinemuri River at Waikino due to the availability of water power, and to keep stamping noise away from Waihi township. Maximum gradient was 1 in 40 (25‰), with the rails being 40 lb/yard (20 kg/m). The tramway started with only one locomotive, named "Ohinemuri", but more were purchased later, ending up with 5 from Manning Wardle, except for the last which was from W. G. Bagnall, as the former company had ceased operating by 1934 when it was purchased. The year 1905 saw the NZ Government Railway open to Waihi, and an overpass was built east of Waihi station to allow the NZR line to pass over the Rake Line. The structure is still there today. By 1952 increasing costs lead to the closure of the Martha Mine (the mine later re-opened in 1987 as open cast). The tramway took around two years to be lifted, with no locos or rolling stock being preserved.

Rolling stock

Locomotives

Wagons 
Small 4-wheel V-tip trucks were used for the transport of quartz. Some small goods and flat wagons were used, the latter occasionally for the exceptional transport of passengers, as the railway has never been a common carrier.

Nearby railways

The Goldfields Railway is a  gauge heritage railway between Waihi and Waikino on a section of track that was part of the East Coast Main Trunk Railway until the Kaimai Tunnel deviation made it redundant in 1978.

References

External links
 Rake Line Historical Photo Gallery
 Victoria Battery Tramway Website
 Hauraki Rail Trail: Paeroa to Waihi

2 ft 9 in gauge railways
Railway lines in New Zealand
Mining railways in New Zealand
Closed railway lines in New Zealand
Gold mining in New Zealand